The Toboggan Cavalier (German: Der Rodelkavalier) is a 1918 German silent comedy film directed by Ernst Lubitsch and starring Ossi Oswalda, Harry Liedtke and Lubitsch.

It was shot at the Tempelhof Studios in Berlin. The film's sets were designed by the art director Kurt Richter.

Cast
 Ernst Lubitsch as Sally Piner 
 Ferry Sikla as Kommerzienrat Hannemann 
 Ossi Oswalda as Ossi Hannemann 
 Erich Schönfelder as Heiratskandidat 
 Julius Falkenstein as Liebhaber 
 Harry Liedtke

References

Bibliography
 Kristin Thompson. Herr Lubitsch Goes to Hollywood: German and American Film After World War I. Amsterdam University Press, 2005.

External links

1918 films
Films of the German Empire
German silent feature films
Films directed by Ernst Lubitsch
German comedy films
1918 comedy films
UFA GmbH films
Films shot at Tempelhof Studios
German black-and-white films
Silent comedy films
1910s German films